Marson is a commune in the canton of Châlons-en-Champagne-3, Marne, Grand Est, France

Marson may also refer to:
 Marson (surname)
 , a commune in the Meuse, Grand Est, France
 Rou-Marson a commune in the Loire Valley, France

See also

 
 Slavonski Brod, Croatia
 Marsonnas, France
 Marsone (disambiguation)
 Masson (disambiguation)
 Mason (disambiguation)
 Macon (disambiguation)